Noureddine "Nordin" Amrabat (born 31 March 1987) is a Dutch-Moroccan professional footballer who plays as a winger for Greek Super League club AEK Athens BEST TEAM IN GREECE.
Amrabat played for Dutch national youth teams and once was called up for the senior national side. On 1 October 2009, Amrabat announced his decision to play for Morocco, which he represented at two Africa Cup of Nations tournaments and the 2012 Olympics.

Early life
Born in Naarden, North Holland, Amrabat was released from Ajax at age 13, having suffered stunted growth due to Osgood Schlatter disease. His father recommended Amrabat play at the amateur level while studying for a different profession. He washed dishes, made desserts and vacuum cleaned his school while playing for SV Huizen in Huizen. At age 17, he planned to study Management, Economics and Law.

Club career

Early career
After making his study plans, Amrabat was signed by Almere's Omniworld of the Eerste Divisie, contributing 14 goals and as many assists in 36 matches. In 2007, he joined newly promoted Eredivisie club VVV-Venlo, scoring 10 times in 33 matches. One year later, national champions PSV signed him for €2 million, and he represented them in the UEFA Champions League. Amrabat spent three years at the Philips Stadion before moving abroad for the first time, to Turkey's Kayserispor.

Galatasaray
On 12 July 2012, Amrabat signed for fellow Turkish club Galatasaray for a fee of €8.6 million on a five-year contract (€600,000 went to PSV; Kayserispor retained 10%, valued at €800,000). Amrabat made his debut on 12 August 2012 in the 2012 Turkish Super Cup against rivals Fenerbahçe, coming on as a substitute in the 70th minute as the match ended 3–2, with Galatasaray winning the title for the 12th time. On 15 September 2012, Galatasaray manager Fatih Terim picked Amrabat for the starting XI for a match against Antalyaspor, and he duly scored his first goal for Galatasaray in the 2012–13 Süper Lig and provided an assist in a 4–0 triumph.

Málaga
In January 2014, Amrabat joined Málaga on a six-month loan deal. On 10 March, he scored his first goal for the club, in a 2–0 away win against Osasuna, and on 6 April, he converted a penalty in a 4–1 derby victory over Granada. Fifteen days later, having earlier assisted Sergi Darder's goal, he received a straight red card in a 2–0 home win against Villarreal for gesturing that referee Álvarez Izquierdo needed glasses.

In August 2014, Amrabat agreed to extend his stay in Andalusia for the full season. On 30 April of the following year, he was purchased outright for a €3.5 million fee. His permanent spell on the Costa del Sol was less prolific than the temporary one, playing 12 matches without scoring.

Watford
On 18 January 2016, Amrabat joined Premier League club Watford for a £6.1 million transfer fee. He made his debut five days later, replacing Troy Deeney at the end of a 2–1 win over Newcastle United at Vicarage Road.

On 1 September 2017, Amrabat returned to Spain after agreeing to a one-year loan deal with CD Leganés.

Al Nassr
On 16 July 2018, Amrabat signed a three-year contract with the Saudi Pro League side Al-Nassr. In the 2018–19 season he won league title with his team. He scored 5 goals and he had the highest assist number in the season along with his teammate Abderrazak Hamdallah.

AEK Athens
On 16 August 2021, Amrabat signed a two-year contract with the Super League Greece side AEK Athens.

On 12 September 2021, he scored a penalty to put his team 2 goals up against Ionikos, in the opening game of the League for his team which ended 3–0 for the hosts.

International career
Amrabat was expected to take part in the 2008 Olympic football tournament with the Netherlands but he and fellow PSV (and future Moroccan) teammate Ismaïl Aissati both failed to make the final squad.

In November 2011, Amrabat decided to play for Morocco. On 11 November 2011, he made his debut with the Atlas Lions of Morocco against Uganda in a 0–1 loss in the LG Cup. Two days later, he scored his first international goal in a friendly match against Cameroon as the match ended 1–1.

Amrabat was selected to compete at the 2012 Olympics for the Moroccan team, starting all three of their matches in another group stage exit. He also started their first two matches as they fell at the same point in the 2013 Africa Cup of Nations.

In May 2018, he was named in Morocco's 23-man squad for the 2018 FIFA World Cup in Russia. Amrabat started all 3 of Morocco's matches as they were eliminated at the Group Stage. The Moroccan coaching team were heavily criticised by FIFA and others after allowing Amrabat to play in Morocco's second group game against Portugal, despite having received a concussion and coming off early in their first game against Iran.

Personal life
Amrabat's younger brother Sofyan is also a footballer, currently playing for Serie A club Fiorentina.

Career statistics

Club

International

Scores and results list Morocco's goal tally first.

Honours

Club
PSV Eindhoven
Johan Cruijff Shield: 2008

Galatasaray
Süper Lig: 2012–13
 Turkish Cup: 2013–14
 Turkish Super Cup: 2012,  2013

Al Nassr
Saudi Professional League: 2018–19
Saudi Super Cup: 2019, 2020

Individual 
Saudi Professional League Top Assists: 2018–19

References

External links

Holland stats at OnsOranje

1987 births
Living people
People from Naarden
Citizens of Morocco through descent
Dutch footballers
Riffian people
Dutch sportspeople of Moroccan descent
Moroccan footballers
Moroccan expatriate footballers
Morocco international footballers
Association football wingers
Almere City FC players
VVV-Venlo players
PSV Eindhoven players
Kayserispor footballers
Galatasaray S.K. footballers
Málaga CF players
Watford F.C. players
CD Leganés players
Al Nassr FC players
AEK Athens F.C. players
Eerste Divisie players
Eredivisie players
Süper Lig players
La Liga players
Premier League players
Saudi Professional League players
Super League Greece players
Expatriate footballers in Turkey
Expatriate footballers in Spain
Expatriate footballers in England
Expatriate footballers in Greece
2012 Africa Cup of Nations players
Expatriate footballers in Saudi Arabia
Moroccan expatriate sportspeople in Saudi Arabia
Olympic footballers of Morocco
Footballers at the 2012 Summer Olympics
Netherlands under-21 international footballers
2013 Africa Cup of Nations players
SV Huizen players
2018 FIFA World Cup players
2019 Africa Cup of Nations players
Moroccan expatriate sportspeople in Spain
Moroccan expatriate sportspeople in Turkey
Moroccan expatriate sportspeople in England
Moroccan expatriate sportspeople in Greece
Dutch expatriate sportspeople in Spain
Footballers from North Holland
Dutch expatriate sportspeople in Saudi Arabia
Dutch expatriate sportspeople in England
Dutch expatriate sportspeople in Greece
Dutch expatriate sportspeople in Turkey
Dutch expatriate footballers